is a Japanese tokusatsu TV drama series that began airing on July 11, 2021. It is the fifth and final instalment for the Girls × Heroine Series produced by Takara Tomy and OLM, Inc. (with the assistance of Shogakukan and EXPG Studio).

The series stars Tsubaki Nagayama and Hiiro Fukasawa. Additional cast members include Kurea Masuda, Ukyo Matsumoto and Nonoka Yamaguchi. The series is also narrated by Atsuko Maeda. The plot centers around the Kirameki Powers, a duo who protect the world from the Makkura Empire, with the help of the Kirapawa Kingdom. The series celebrates the franchise's fifth anniversary.

The show launched a brief idol career for the main cast members. It was the first Girls × Heroine Series installment to be shown in Okinawa via Ryukyu Broadcasting Corporation since July 25, 2021.

On August 22, during Ciao Fest, Yuwa Higa and Kanna Sato were confirmed as the two new heroines.

From episode 39 until the series finale, the episode length was reduced from 30 to 15 minutes.

Plot 
5th grade elementary school student, Kirari Momose, encounters a fairy who jumps out of a game console. The fairy, Himenyan, is actually the Princess of the Kirapawa Kingdom, a kingdom that is located inside popular sword and magic game "Kirapawa Morimori Adventure". The Princess, who was afraid of the enemy, ran away but was chased by those from the Makkura Empire. Becoming friends with Kirari, Kirari transforms into the "Heroine of the Sun, Kirapawa Sunny" where she fights the Makkura Empire. Joining with Yuzuki Shimori, Honoka Akashiro and Koyuki Aoba along the way, the four collect the Kirapawa Memories in order to win against the Witch of Darkness, Makkulala.

Characters

Kirameki Powers 
The Kirameki Powers is a group of four girls who fight against the Makkura Empire in order to stop them from turning the world dark. The Kirapawa Memory give them various abilities they can use with the Kirapawa Change, which they can store in the Kirapawa Memory Book. As the series goes on, they using Max Memory and Girls × Heroine Memories, which allow them to transform into Bibitto Max.

 
 Played by: Tsubaki Nagayama
 An energetic 5th grade elementary school student who loves to make friends. Her catchphrase is, "The be-beep has come! Clear the Darkness with a Heated heart!"

 
 Played by: Hiiro Fukasawa
 A kind and gentle hearted 2nd year middle school student who always wants to help others. Her catchphrase is "If I were to be of any Help! Clear the Darkness with a Healing Heart!"

 Played by: Yuwa Higa
 Originally a fairy named Pippii, she transforms into a human to save Kirari and Yuzuki. A bright and competitive girl who hates to lose, she's skilled in flexibility and martial arts. Her catchphrase is "Burning Brilliantly! Clear the Darkness with a Powerful Heart!"

 Played by: Kanna Sato
 Originally a fairy named Hamurii, she transforms into a human to save Kirari and Yuzuki. A mature and cool girl. Her catchphrase is "Now is the Time to Decide! Clear the Darkness with a Sparkling Heart!"

Kirapawa Kingdom 

 Played by: Kurea Masuda
 Princess of the Kirapawa Kingdom. She ran away from the Makkura Empire and turns into the fairy, Himenyan.

 Played by: Ukyo Matsumoto
 The Princess' butler. He goes to earth due to worrying about the Princess.

 Voiced by: Sakura Namiki
 The Princess of the Kirapawa Kingdom in fairy-form. She assists the Kirameki Powers.

 Voiced by: Saki Miyashita
 A chick-like fairy and one of Himenyan's friends from the Kirapawa Kingdom. When fighting, Pippii likes to peck at people but it doesn't hurt.

 Voiced by: Sayumi Watabe
 A hamster-like fairy and one of Himenyan's friends from the Kirapawa Kingdom. When fighting, Hamurii likes to bite at people but instead it just tickles.

Makkura Empire 

 Played by: Nonoka Yamaguchi
 The Witch of Darkness who rules over the Makkura Empire.

 Played by: Shion Suzuki
 One of the Four Kings of the Makkura Empire.

 Played by: Satoshi Uekiya

 Played by: Kentaro Tamura

 Played by: Ayumu Miyazaki

Production 
The series was first revealed in March 2021 after a trademark had been published, before being officially announced through news outlets on May 21, 2021, upon the release of  Police × Heroine Lovepatrina!:The Movie: Challenge from a Phantom Thief! Let's Arrest with Love and a Pat!. Along with the official logo, the series released the logo for their 5th anniversary.

On Oha Suta, May 31, 2021, the Bittomo × Heroine Kirameki Powers! cast and visuals were revealed for the first time. The show stars Tsubaki Nagayama and Hiiro Fukasawa as the main heroine's. In addition to the main cast, the show's supporting cast includes Kurea Masuda From "Magical x Heroine Magimajo Pures!". Ukyo Matsumoto From "(Ultraman X / Kamen Rider Ex-Aid)". Nonoka Yamaguchi and Shion Suzuki were also included as part of the main cast. Further featuring the voices of Sakura Namiki, Saki Miyashita and Sayumi Watabe, with Atsuko Maeda revealed to be the narrator. Yuwa Higa and Kanna Sato, members of idol group Lucky², were later confirmed to play the roles of Honoka and Koyuki.

Media

Episode list

Bittomo × Heroine Kirameki Powers! is broadcast weekly from July 11, 2021 on TV Tokyo at 9:00 AM.

References

External links 
 Official Website

2021 Japanese television series debuts
Girls × Heroine! television series
Japanese children's television series
Japanese drama television series
Magical girl television series
OLM, Inc.
Tokusatsu television series
TV Tokyo original programming